In representation theory, a branch of mathematics, the Kostant partition function, introduced by , of a root system  is the number of ways one can represent a vector (weight) as a non-negative integer linear combination of the positive roots .  Kostant used it to rewrite the Weyl character formula as a formula (the Kostant multiplicity formula) for the multiplicity of a weight of an irreducible representation of a semisimple Lie algebra. An alternative formula, that is more computationally efficient in some cases, is Freudenthal's formula.

The Kostant partition function can also be defined for Kac–Moody algebras and has similar properties.

An example

 
This expression gives one way to write  as a non-negative integer combination of positive roots; other expressions can be obtained by replacing  with  some number of times. We can do the replacement  times, where .
.
This result is shown graphically in the image at right. If an element  is not of the form , then .

Relation to the Weyl character formula

Inverting the Weyl denominator
For each root  and each , we can formally apply the formula for the sum of a geometric series to obtain

where we do not worry about convergence—that is, the equality is understood at the level of formal power series. Using Weyl's denominator formula

we obtain a formal expression for the reciprocal of the Weyl denominator:

Here, the first equality is by taking a product over the positive roots of the geometric series formula and the second equality is by counting all the ways a given exponential  can occur in the product.

Rewriting the character formula
This argument shows that we can convert the Weyl character formula for the irreducible representation with highest weight :

from a quotient to a product:

The multiplicity formula
Using the preceding rewriting of the character formula, it is relatively easy to write the character as a sum of exponentials. The coefficients of these exponentials are the multiplicities of the corresponding weights. We thus obtain a formula for the multiplicity of a given weight  in the irreducible representation with highest weight :
.
This result is the Kostant multiplicity formula. 

Thus, although the sum is nominally over the whole Weyl group, in most cases, the number of nonzero terms is smaller than the order of the Weyl group.

References

Sources

 
 Humphreys, J.E. Introduction to Lie algebras and representation theory, Springer, 1972.

Representation theory
Representation theory of Lie algebras
Types of functions